Rayni Fox (born May 24, 1956) is an American former tennis player who was active from the mid-1970s until the early 1980s.

As a junior player Fox was a singles runner-up to Mima Jaušovec at the 1973 Orange Bowl. In 1974 she won the U.S. Girls' 18s national singles title. Fox attended Rollins College for two years before turning pro in August 1975.

During her career Fox played in all four Grand Slam tournaments. Her best result was reaching the doubles final at the 1977 French Open with Helen Cawley in which they were defeated in three sets by Regina Maršíková and Pam Teeguarden. Her best result in singles occurred in 1977 when she reached the quarterfinals at the Australian Open in which she lost to second-seeded Sue Barker. At the Wimbledon Championships, she reached the third round in 1977 and 1979.

With a solid volleys and good speed, she was more successful in doubles than in singles. On the WTA Tour, she won two doubles titles with Helen Cawley in Switzerland and Austria, and she won three Avon Futures doubles titles with Bunny Bruning in North America. Fox became the singles champion at the Tasmanian Open in January 1977, defeating Lesley Bowrey in the final in three sets.

Fox played in the World Team Tennis competition in 1975 (Pittsburgh Triangles), 1976 (Cleveland Nets) and 1978 (Phoenix Racquets).

She was married to Arthur Borinsky who was a business man and marshal. In 2006 she was inducted into the MetroWest Jewish Sports Hall of Fame. Fox is currently a professional tennis coach in Chatham, New Jersey.

Grand Slam finals

Doubles (1 runner-up)

Career finals

Singles (1 title)

Doubles (2 titles)

References

External links 
 
 

1956 births
Living people
American female tennis players
Sportspeople from Miami Beach, Florida
Tennis people from Florida
21st-century American women